Cedar Grove is an unincorporated community in Roane County, Tennessee, United States.

References 

Unincorporated communities in Roane County, Tennessee
Unincorporated communities in Tennessee